Samuel Tilden Norton (January 21, 1877 – February 16, 1959), or S. Tilden Norton as he was known professionally, was a Los Angeles-based architect active in the first decades of the 20th century. During his professional career he was associated with the firm of Norton & Wallis, responsible for the design of many Los Angeles landmarks.

Personal life
Norton was born on January 21, 1877, to Isaac and Bertha (Greenbaum) Norton. Isaac Norton moved to Los Angeles in 1869 and was the founder of an early building and loan firm, Metropolitan Building and Loan Assn. Bertha was the daughter of Mr. and Mrs. E. Greenbaum, the latter the first Jewish woman to come to Los Angeles, having arrived in 1851. Bertha Norton was said by her family to be the first Jewish child born in the city. Norton's siblings included Albert, an attorney and financier and Florence (Florie) Norton Desenberg (married M. B. Desenberg).

Norton graduated in 1895 from Los Angeles High School.

Norton married the former Esther Gro(e)del, daughter of Selina and Louis Groedel, in Baltimore in 1904. They had a daughter, Elizabeth, who attended USC, married J. L. Rudé, and bore Norton three grandchildren. The family lived for many years at 66 Fremont Place near downtown Los Angeles. Norton died on February 16, 1959, at the age of 82 after a long illness, at Cedars of Lebanon Hospital, predecessor to today's Cedars-Sinai Medical Center.

Professional career
Following his graduation from high school, Norton immediately began his professional training working as a draftsman for Edward Neissen, a Los Angeles architect. He later moved temporarily to New York City for further design apprenticeship work. Upon his return to Los Angeles, Norton founded his own architectural firm around 1902 at 253 South Broadway, Room 316. He later moved to 607 South Hill Street, Room 418. By the 1930s, his office was at Room 1210, 704 South Spring Street—the Financial Center Building of which he had been the architect in 1927. Norton had early on formed a partnership with Frederick H. Wallis, their firm being known as Norton and Wallis, Architects. He was also associated with the family-owned Norton Investment Company (or Norton Securities Company).

Community activities
Norton was very involved in his community. He was a founder and charter member of the Hillcrest Country Club and served as a director of the Prudential Building and Loan Association. He was also a proud upholder of his faith, serving as president of the Board of Trustees of Congregation B'nai B'rith, the Jewish Men's Professional Club of Los Angeles, Nathan Straus Palestine Society, and Jewish Consumption Relief,. In addition, he was a director of the Federation of Jewish Welfare Organizations, the Jewish Welfare Fund, and Wilshire Boulevard Temple. Norton was professionally active as well, having served as president of the Southern California Chapter of the American Institute of Architects which he had joined around 1912. He also wrote articles about houses for The Illustrated Magazine beginning in the early 1900s.

Portfolio
Norton was responsible for the design of many Jewish landmarks in the Los Angeles area, such as: 
 B'nai B'rith lodge building at 9th and Union Streets (1923)
 Jewish Orphans Home of Southern California at Vista Del Mar (1924)
 Sinai Temple at 407 South New Hampshire (1924)—described as an "Eastern Mediterranean mixture of Islamic and Byzantine motifs"
 Young Men's Hebrew Association at Soto Street and Michigan Avenue, East Los Angeles (1925)
 Council House, on Loma Drive, for the Council of Jewish Women (1926)
 Israel Temple at Franklin and Argyle in Hollywood (1927)
 another Sinai Temple at 12th and Valencia (1929)

He was also an associate architect between 1922 and 1929 for the Temple B'nai B'rith at Wilshire and Hobart Boulevards, now known as the Wilshire Boulevard Temple.

Besides those buildings mentioned above, other Norton works include the following (all in Los Angeles unless otherwise noted):

1902–1910 
 Flat building, 7th & Union Streets (1902)
 County Hospital (1902—plans entered in an architectural competition)
 Apartment house, Winston between Wall and San Pedro Streets (1903)
 Three-flat building, California west of Hill Street (1903)
 H. M. Nichols residence, Glendora (1903)
 Residence at 1656 W. 25th Street (1905) 
 Amestoy Residence, 1659 South Hobart Blvd. in Harvard Heights, built for John B. Amestoy, son of Dominique Amestoy (1903). Building and Contractor reported that

 Central Department Store, 609–619 S. Broadway, Los Angeles (1906-7, demolished c.1930-1, site of Los Angeles Theatre)
 Concordia Club remodel, 16th (now Venice Boulevard and Figueroa Streets (1909)
 a synagogue at 1153 S. Valencia St. for the Sinai congregation, just west of what is now the Los Angeles Convention Center; Los Angeles Historic-Cultural Monument No. 173 (1909). Greek Revival. Sold to the Welsh Presbyterian Church congregation in 1926.
 Norton Block (six stores and a theater), Maricopa (1910)

1911–1920
 Apartment building on 4th between San Pedro and Crocker Streets (1912)
 Business building for the Sing Fat Company, perhaps at 350 S. Broadway (1912)
 Allen Hotel, Pier & Ocean Front, Ocean Park in Santa Monica (1913)
 Southern California Gas Co. Headquarters at 950 S. Broadway (1913)
 Group of buildings at Universal Studios (1914)
 Office block at southeast comer, 5th and Main Streets  (1914)—a ten-story "skyscraper"
 I. F. Norton residence on Norton Avenue between 1st and 2nd Streets (1915)

1921–1930
 Hotel at 2nd and Figueroa Streets (1923)
 Independent Order of B'nai B'rith, 846 S. Union Street at 9th (present-day James M. Wood Boulevard) Sts. (1923)
 Temple Sinai East, another synagogue for the Sinai congregation at 407 South New Hampshire Avenue, a 1400-seat building used until 1960. Currently occupied by Korean Philadelphia Presbyterian Church.
 A. E. Newman residence, 86 Fremont Place (1929)
 Hollywood Center at 6652-54 Hollywood Boulevard (at Cherokee) (1929)-originally known as the Shane & Regar Store Building, this is a four-story edifice described as a "marvelous art deco" building with a "distinguished lobby."  First home of the Screen Actors Guild and of the Writers Guild of America. "An example of the subset of Art Deco known as Zigzag Moderne."
 Greek Theatre, Griffith Park (1929–30)
 William Fox Office Building at 608 South Hill Street (1930)—a Zigzag Moderne 13-story Art Deco office tower with a black-and-gold vestibule and lobby (now the Fox Jewelry Mart)
 Los Angeles Theatre at 615 Broadway, (1930 co-credit with S. Charles Lee)
 Southern California Telephone Company remodel, 626 South Hill Street (1931)

Buildings designed by S. Tilden Norton with Wikipedia entries are here.

Notes

References
"Who's Who in Callfornia", 1942/43, p. 686.
"Southwest Jewry", vol. 1, 1926, p. 45. (see image at :File:S. Tilden Norton Biography.pdf)
Los Angeles Times, Feb. 17, 1959, "Samuel T. Norton, 82, Noted Architect, Dies; Member of Pioneer Family, He Designed Many Outstanding Structures in L.A." (see image at :File:Samuel Tilden Norton Obituary notice.pdf)

Architects from California
20th-century American architects
American theatre architects
American ecclesiastical architects
Art Deco architects
American Jews
Jewish architects
Greek Revival architects
1877 births
1959 deaths
Artists from Los Angeles
Los Angeles High School alumni